The 1985 Australian Open was a tennis tournament played on grass courts at the Kooyong Lawn Tennis Club in Melbourne in Victoria in Australia. It was the 74th edition of the Australian Open and was held from 25 November through 8 December 1985; the last to be held at this time of year, 17 days before Christmas Day 1985.

With the decision to hold the tournament in January in future, the next Australian Open would be the 1987 Open, held just over a year later.

Seniors

Men's singles

 Stefan Edberg defeated  Mats Wilander, 6–4, 6–3, 6–3
• It was Edberg's 1st career Grand Slam singles title.

Women's singles

 Martina Navratilova defeated  Chris Evert, 6–2, 4–6, 6–2
• It was Navratilova's 13th career Grand Slam singles title and her 3rd and last title at the Australian Open.

Men's doubles

 Paul Annacone /  Christo van Rensburg defeated  Mark Edmondson /  Kim Warwick, 3–6, 7–6, 6–4, 6–4 
• It was Annacone's 1st and only career Grand Slam doubles title.
• It was van Rensburg's 1st and only career Grand Slam doubles title.

Women's doubles

 Martina Navratilova /  Pam Shriver defeated  Claudia Kohde-Kilsch /  Helena Suková 6–3, 6–4 
 It was Navratilova's 37th career Grand Slam title and her 8th Australian Open title. It was Shriver's 12th career Grand Slam title and her 4th Australian Open title.

Mixed doubles
The competition was not held between 1970 and 1985.

Juniors

Boys' singles
 Shane Barr defeated  Steve Furlong 7–6, 6–7, 6–3

Girls' singles
 Jenny Byrne defeated  Louise Field 6–1, 6–3

Boys' doubles
 Brett Custer /  David Macpherson defeated  Petr Korda /  Cyril Suk 7–5, 6–2

Girls' doubles
 Jenny Byrne /  Janine Thompson defeated  Sally McCann /  Alison Scott 6–0, 6–3

External links
 Official website Australian Open

 
 

 
1985 in Australian tennis
November 1985 sports events in Australia
December 1985 sports events in Australia
1985,Australian Opene